Samuel Walton Garman (June 5, 1843 – September 30, 1927), or "Garmann" as he sometimes styled himself, was an American naturalist and zoologist. He became noted as an ichthyologist and herpetologist.

Biography
Garman was born in Indiana County, Pennsylvania, on 5 June 1843. In 1868 he joined an expedition to the American West with John Wesley Powell. He graduated from the Illinois State Normal University in 1870, and for the following year was principal of the Mississippi State Normal School. In 1871, he became professor of natural sciences in Ferry Hall Seminary, Lake Forest, Illinois, and a year later became a special pupil of Louis Agassiz. He was a friend and regular correspondent of the naturalist Edward Drinker Cope, and in 1872 accompanied him on a fossil hunting trip to Wyoming. In 1870 he became assistant director of herpetology and ichthyology at Harvard's Museum of Comparative Zoology. His work was mostly in the classification of fish, especially sharks, but also included reptiles and amphibians. Harvard College awarded him honorary degrees for his scientific work, B.S. in 1898 and A.M. in 1899.

Personal
While working at Harvard, he lived in Arlington Heights, Massachusetts. In 1895, he married Florence Armstrong of Saint John, New Brunswick.  They had a daughter.

Taxon described by him
See :Category:Taxa named by Samuel Garman

Taxon named in his honor 
Garman is commemorated in the scientific name of a species of Jamaican lizard, Anolis garmani.
The Rosette skate Leucoraja garmani  (Whitley, 1939) is named after him.
Diaphus garmani, the Garman's lanternfish, is a species of lanternfish found worldwide.

Publications (selected)

References

External links

.

1843 births
1927 deaths
American taxonomists
American herpetologists
American ichthyologists
19th-century American zoologists
20th-century American zoologists
Harvard University staff
Illinois State University alumni
People from Indiana County, Pennsylvania